Scott County is a county located in the southwestern part of the U.S. state of Virginia. As of the 2020 census, the population was 21,576. Its county seat is Gate City. Scott County was formed by an act of the General Assembly on November 24, 1814, from parts of Washington, Lee, and Russell Counties and was named for Virginia born General Winfield Scott. Scott County is part of the Kingsport–Bristol–Bristol, TN-VA Metropolitan Statistical Area, which is a component of the Johnson City–Kingsport–Bristol, TN-VA Combined Statistical Area, commonly known as the "Tri-Cities" region. The County Administrator is Freda Russell Starnes.

History
The early settlers found evidence of a former native village at the mouth of Stony Creek on the Clinch river. Thomas McCulloch was the first white settler within the county, in 1769.  Daniel Boone commanded several forts located here in 1774 during Dunmore's War, and several more were built in successive years.

Even so, the Chickamauga Cherokee leader Bob Benge remained active in the area throughout this time, during the Cherokee–American wars, up until he was killed in 1794.
By the time houses were built in the 1790s, the largely Scots-Irish population had increased by reason of its situation along the Wilderness Road. After Scott County was formed in 1814, the first court took place in 1815, and the first public schools in 1870.

Geography

Adjacent counties
 Wise County - north
 Russell County - northeast
 Washington County - east
 Sullivan County, Tennessee - south
 Hawkins County, Tennessee - south
 Hancock County, Tennessee - southwest
 Lee County - west

National protected area
 Jefferson National Forest (part)

Major highways

Demographics

2020 census

Note: the US Census treats Hispanic/Latino as an ethnic category. This table excludes Latinos from the racial categories and assigns them to a separate category. Hispanics/Latinos can be of any race.

2010 Census
As of the 2010 United States Census, there were 23,177 people living in the county. 97.9% were White, 0.6% Black or African American, 0.2% Native American, 0.2% Asian, 0.1% Pacific Islander, 0.4% of some other race and 0.7 of two or more races. 1.0% were Hispanic or Latino (of any race).

As of the census of 2000, there were 23,403 people, 9,795 households, and 7,023 families living in the county.  The population density was 44 people per square mile (17/km2).  There were 11,355 housing units at an average density of 21 per square mile (8/km2).  The racial makeup of the county was 98.51% White, 0.59% Black or African American, 0.14% Native American, 0.07% Asian, 0.02% Pacific Islander, 0.15% from other races, and 0.52% from two or more races.  0.42% of the population were Hispanic or Latino of any race.

There were 9,795 households, out of which 27.60% had children under the age of 18 living with them, 59.40% were married couples living together, 9.00% had a female householder with no husband present, and 28.30% were non-families. 26.10% of all households were made up of individuals, and 13.10% had someone living alone who was 65 years of age or older.  The average household size was 2.35 and the average family size was 2.82.

In the county, 20.60% of the population was under the age of 18, 7.50% was from 18 to 24, 27.30% from 25 to 44, 26.80% from 45 to 64, and 17.80% was 65 years of age or older.  The median age was 41 years. For every 100 females, there were 93.30 males.  For every 100 females age 18 and over, there were 90.70 males.

The median income for a household in the county was $27,339, and the median income for a family was $33,163. Males had a median income of $28,328 versus $20,553 for females. The per capita income for the county was $15,073.  About 13.00% of families and 16.80% of the population were below the poverty line, including 20.10% of those under age 18 and 20.50% of those age 65 or over.

Education

Public high schools 
 Gate City High School, Gate City
 Rye Cove High School, Clinchport
 Twin Springs High School, Nickelsville

Communities

Towns
 Clinchport
 Duffield
 Dungannon
 Gate City
 Nickelsville
 Weber City

Unincorporated communities
 Copper Creek
 Daniel Boone
 Fairview
 Fort Blackmore
 Hiltons
 Mabe
 Maces Spring
 Manville
 Rye Cove
 Snowflake
 Stanleytown
 Yuma

Notable people
 June Carter Cash
 The Carter Family
 Claude M. Hilton
 Jerry Kilgore
 Riley Franklin McConnell (USS McConnell)

 Mac McClung
 Arnold Lane, train engineer
 Terry Kilgore

Politics

See also
 National Register of Historic Places listings in Scott County, Virginia

References

External links
 Scott County, Virginia's Official Website
 Scott County, Virginia's Public Safety/GIS page

 
Virginia counties
1814 establishments in Virginia
Populated places established in 1814
Kingsport–Bristol metropolitan area
Counties of Appalachia